Freddy Juarez (born April 1, 1978) is an American soccer coach and former player. He is currently an assistant coach with Seattle Sounders FC. Juarez most recently was the head coach of Real Salt Lake in Major League Soccer.

Playing career
He began his professional career in 1998 with the El Paso Patriots. In 2004, he moved to the Minnesota Thunder for four seasons.

1999-2000 Wichita Wings NPSL (MISL)
2005 Invited into U.S. Men's National Team Camp
2007 U.S. Men's National Futsal Team

Coaching career
During the off season, Freddy also coaches a premier club team in Las Cruces, New Mexico. He has had much success coaching many teams from the New Mexico Striker F.C. His U19 team has won the New Mexico state championship six times and made it to the Far West Regional finals on more than one occasion. Coaching, Freddy has produced two professional players, brothers Edgar Castillo and Noel Castillo.

He served as an assistant coach for Real Salt Lake of Major League Soccer; he was elevated to interim head coach on August 11, 2019, after the firing of Mike Petke.  In December 2019 he became the team's fifth head coach. On August 27, 2021, it was announced that Freddy had parted ways with immediate effect from Real Salt Lake for a new opportunity, with Pablo Mastroeni taking over as interim head coach.

On September 1, 2021, Seattle Sounders FC announced that Juarez had been hired as an assistant coach.

Coaching record

References

1978 births
Living people
El Paso Patriots players
USL First Division players
American sportspeople of Mexican descent
Minnesota Thunder players
Soccer players from New Mexico
A-League (1995–2004) players
American soccer players
Real Salt Lake non-playing staff
Association football defenders
Real Monarchs coaches
American soccer coaches
Real Salt Lake coaches
Sportspeople from Las Cruces, New Mexico
Wichita Wings (NPSL) players
National Professional Soccer League (1984–2001) players
American men's futsal players
Seattle Sounders FC non-playing staff